Yunus ibn Habib (died after 183 AH/798 CE) was a reputable 8th-century Arab linguist. An early literary critic and expert on poetry, Ibn Habib's criticisms of poetry were known, along with those of contemporaries such as Al-Asma'i, as a litmus test for measuring later writers' eloquence.

Ibn Habib's exact tribal last name, date of birth and age at death have been an issue of contention. Medieval historian Ibn Khallikan mentions three possible tribes that he belonged to, two possible dates of birth and two possible ages at the time of his death. He never married nor did he ever take a mistress, having devoted all of his life to either studying or teaching.

His notable teachers include: Hammad ibn Salamah from whom he took knowledge in Arabic grammar, Al-Akhfash al-Akbar and Abu 'Amr ibn al-'Ala'. His students include Sibawayh, Al-Kisa'i, Yaḥyá ibn Ziyād al-Farrāʼ and Abu ʿUbaidah. Abu Ubaida once remarked that he attended the lessons of Ibn Habib every day for forty years, and every day he left with pages of notes copied from what Ibn Habib dictated from memory.

Sibawayhi, considered the father of Arabic grammar despite being Persian, quoted Ibn Habib 217 times in his famous Kitab, Ibn Habib is one of two figures (the other being Al-Khalil ibn Ahmad al-Farahidi) regarded as Sibawayhi's formative teachers.

Works 
List of known works by Yunus ibn Habib:

 Kitāb maʻānī al-Qurʼān (كتاب معاني القرآن)
 Kitāb al-lughāt (كتاب اللغات)
 Kitāb al-nawādir al-kabīr (كتاب النوادر الكبير)
 Kitāb al-nawādir al-ṣaghīr (كتاب النوادر الصغير)
 Kitāb al-amthāl (كتاب الأمثال)

References 

Iranian grammarians
Iranian writers
8th-century Persian-language writers
Medieval grammarians of Arabic
Grammarians of Basra